Vilseck is a town in the Oberpfalz region of northeastern Bavaria, Germany, situated on the river Vils, a tributary of the Naab river.

The town is geographically separate from a nearby large American military base known as the Rose Barracks but more commonly referred to as Vilseck. The base, built in 1937–1938, was captured during World War II from the Germans; it was previously known as Südlager.

The town is 402 meters (1,300 feet) above sea level.

Its name comes from the location of a castle built in 920.  Eck is the German word for corner.  The Vils river has a tight bend where the Burg  is located.  Thus, the name Vilseck.

Nearby municipalities
Direct neighbour municipality are the municipalities Edelsfeld, Königstein, Freihung and Hahnbach.

History

920
Construction of the castle at around 925. Primawatchtower with piling and moat, stone watchtower built in the 12th century. At this time a "Burg" (castle) on an elevated place was often called an Eck; thus the name Vilseck derived from: City next to the Vilsburg. (Vilseck). It is also possible that the name comes from the fact that the city is situated on the Vils on a west-to-east stretch between two distinct 90-degree bends in the river. The German word for corner is also "Eck".

1104
Destruction of the castle by Emperor Heinrich IV during a devastating campaign against Berengar from Sulzbach.

1185
First documentation of the town "Vilseck"

1188-1268
Affiliation of Vilseck and surrounding areas to the administrative district of the Episcopal-Bamberg bailiwick (Vogtei) under the protection of the Stauffer Emperor.

1190
Earliest documentation of the second castle. In the following years construction of a new castle with the growing of the new city of Vilseck. City and Castle accrete.

1269-1802
Town area belongs to the administrative office of the Bishop of Bamberg.

1289
First documentation of "City" (ciuitatis) of Vilseck.

1332-1380
Construction of the city fortification: 940 m (half a mile) curtain wall, (9 m (30 feet) high, 1.60 m (5 feet) thick), 17 towers and three gates surrounded by a moat.

1380
Awarding of the city crest by Lampert von Brunn, Bishop of Bamberg.
Construction of the town hall (Rathaus).

Construction of choir aisle and nave on Romanic foundation, remaining from 11th century, at the church in Schlicht.

1407-1412
Construction of parish church on from 11th century remaining Romanic foundation.

1466
Construction of the Vogelturm "bird-tower" (well-known landmark and symbol of Vilseck).

1512
Castle is attacked, plundered and burned down by the knights Hans Pflug and Hand Selbitz, comrades-in-arms of Götz von Berlichingens. Afterwards - reconstruction.

1522
Majority of the city, including the town hall, burns down.
Plundering of city through Margrave (Markgraf) Albrecht IV from Hohenzollern-Brandenburg.

1620
Pillaged during Thirty Years' War.

1631-1634
The black death carries off most of population.

1638-1639
Pillaged during Thirty Years' War.

1751-1754
Construction of the nave at Catholic church in baroque style.

1802
Since 1802 affiliation to Bavaria.

1803
Integration into the Oberpfalz. (Upper Palatinate District).

1808
Local villages, like Gressenwöhr, Irlbach, Langenbruck, Schlicht and Sigl, become political structured communities.

1838
After authorization through King Ludwig I. the Landgericht (County Court) is set in the Vilseck cityhall.

1852-1919
In this timeframe a "Vilseck District" exists as major regional authority with the communities of Adlholz, Ehenfeld, Gebenbach, Gressenwöhr, Großschönbrunn, Hahnbach, Iber, Irlbach, Kürmreuth, Langenbruck, Massenricht, Schlicht, Seugast, Sigl, Sigras, Süß, Vilseck and Weißenberg .

1864
City hall on fire. Ruin will be transferred to state government to construct new district courthouse.

1901
Opening of a public telephone office.

1908
Construction of the Grafenwöhr Training Area North, with displacement of larger parts of the Vilseck Bürgerwald. (forest).

1929-1930
Construction of water supply system

1937
Enlargement of water supply system to supply German Army Base.

1937-1938
Construction of German Army Base (Südlager) in the Grafenwöhr Training Area. For the extension of the Grafenwöhr Training Area several villages, like: Langenbruck, Altenweiher, Altneuhaus, Bernhof, Betzlhof, Erzhäusl, Fenkenhof, Grünwald, Hellziechen, Kittenberg, Schindlhof, Schmierhütte and Wirlhof had to be evacuated.

In 1945, the German Army Base (Sudlager) capitulated to the U.S. Army.

Postwar history
In 1946, the town integrated the villages of Schönlind, Ödgodlricht, Heroldsmühle and Gumpenhof from the broken-down community of Irlbach, forming the community of Schlicht.

In 1951, there was the construction of the new railway station.

In 1955, the city's water supply system was connected to Schlicht.

During the following years (1956–1959), the Protestant church was built.

1957 was the start of construction of the city sewage system.

1962-1964 saw the construction of the new school with gymnasium (The German word "Gymnasium" is equivalent to the English "High School") in Vilseck.

From 1981 to 1993, the US Army extended and enlarged the Rose Barracks for about DM1,000 million.

In 2000 the "Erstes Deutsches Türmermuseum" (1st German museum of tower watchman or tower keeper) had its grand opening.

Vilseck and the U.S. Army
 
Vilseck is home to Rose Barracks, a U.S. Army post located just outside the town.

Currently the following units are based in Rose Barracks:
 2nd Cavalry Regiment
 Bavaria Medical Activity
 72nd Med Det VS
 A Co, 39th Finance
 2nd ASOS
 Elements of the 7th Army Joint Multinational Training Command
 514th Military Police Augmentation Platoon

In 1987, February 20, when the 1st Battalion, 13th Armor rejoined the 1st Armored Division when it moved to Vilseck, Germany. 13th Tank remained here until 1988, when it was inactivated.

In 1990, as part of 1st Brigade, 1st Armored Division; 1st Battalion, 37th Armor was attached to the 3rd "Bulldog" Brigade from Bamberg and deployed to Saudi Arabia for Desert Shield/Storm.  2nd Battalion, 37th Armor along with the Brigade HQ proper remained deployed to Rose Barracks for the duration of the conflict. 2-37 Armor eventually deployed to Kuwait in support of operation Southern Watch and Intrinsic Action.

In 1991, 1st Brigade, 1st Armored Division elements still in Rose Barracks were redesignated 3rd Brigade, 3rd Infantry Division. The units in this brigade at the time of transition to the Marne Division included; 1-6 Inf, 2-37 AR, 1-37 AR, 6-1 FA, and 501st FSB.  Some elements of this Brigade, organized as TF 1-6 Infantry, deployed to Macedonia to perform peacekeeping operations in 1994.

In 2005, the 3rd Brigade of the 1st Infantry Division departed Vilseck Germany after redeployment from Iraq.

In 2006, the 2nd Armored Cavalry Regiment (Stryker) moved to Vilseck.  Vilseck and the Grafenwoehr Training Area will become one of the last remaining major hubs of the American Military in Europe. However, pending a reversal of the decision to remove virtually 75% of the military structure from Europe, the Department of Defense may elect to leave further elements beyond 2012.  As part of the realignment efforts, the American military base at Vilseck has expanded with significant new construction.

In 2008, a 65 metres tall guyed tubular mast radiator was built in Vilseck at 49°38'40"N, 11°47'1"E for broadcasting the program of AFN Powernet on 1107 kHz with 10 kW for the area of Grafenwöhr and Vilseck. It replaced the old transmitter at Grafenwöhr, which was not usable any more for electromagnetic compatibility reasons.

Trivia
The town is home to Germany's first tower museum.

References

External links
 
Information about Grafenwoehr and the area
Information about Rose Barracks, Vilseck

Amberg-Sulzbach